Sean Lock (22 April 1963 – 16 August 2021) was an English comedian and actor. He began his comedy career as a stand-up comedian and in 2000 he won the British Comedy Award, in the category of Best Live Comic, and was nominated for the Perrier Comedy Award. He was a team captain on the Channel 4 comedy panel show 8 Out of 10 Cats from 2005 to 2015, and on 8 Out of 10 Cats Does Countdown from 2012 until his death in 2021.

Lock frequently appeared on stage, television and radio. His routines were often surreal and delivered in a deadpan style. He also wrote material for Bill Bailey, Lee Evans and Mark Lamarr. Lock was voted the 55th-greatest stand-up comic on Channel 4's 100 Greatest Stand-Ups in 2007, and he was upgraded to 19th in the updated 2010 list. He was a frequent guest on other panel shows, including BBC's Have I Got News for You, QI and They Think It's All Over.

Early life
Lock was born in Chertsey, Surrey, on 22 April 1963. His father, Sidney, worked in the building industry. His mother, Mary (née McCreesh), was from Cullaville, County Armagh. Lock, the youngest of four children, was raised in Woking, Surrey, where he attended St John the Baptist School.

During Lock's teenage years, he watched art-house films on BBC Two, and named Andrei Tarkovsky's 1979 science-fiction film Stalker as one that affected him greatly. In 1981, he left education with a grade E in English A-Level. Afterwards, his father got him a job stripping concrete panels off buildings. After spending seven years as a labourer, he travelled, taking on different jobs. For six weeks, he worked on a French farm as a goat herder and worked on a kibbutz in Israel. During this period, he also worked as a toilet cleaner and a Department of Health and Social Security office worker. During his work as a labourer, he developed skin cancer.

He then decided to pursue acting and enrolled at the Drama Centre London, though he soon realised he had made an error. He quit and returned to being a labourer. After Lock saw comedians like Alexei Sayle and Paul Merton performing in comedy clubs, he decided to pursue comedy. Throughout this time, he visited comedy shows in London pubs and started doing open-mic spots as a hobby. In 1988, Lock had his first official gig at a pub in Stoke Newington, London. After being paid £15 for his 20 minutes, he realised he could pursue being a comedian as a career.

Career
Lock's early television work included a supporting role alongside Rob Newman and David Baddiel in the 1993 series Newman and Baddiel in Pieces including touring with them as their support act. Frank Skinner and Eddie Izzard are credited as major influences on his comedy. A popular belief is that Lock was the first stand-up comedian to perform at Wembley Arena, as he was the support act for Newman and Baddiel. But, while Lock was the support act, he only featured in skits in the middle of the show.

15 Minutes of Misery and 15 Storeys High
Lock made regular appearances on various radio panel shows and script-edited for Bill Bailey's 1998 BBC2 series, Is It Bill Bailey?. In December 1998, he launched his own show on BBC Radio 4, 15 Minutes of Misery originally as a five-episode pilot. These shows also featured actors Kevin Eldon and Hattie Hayridge. The premise involved Lock eavesdropping on his neighbours in his south London tower block (all played by Lock, Eldon and Hayridge) using a bugging device fitted by his plumber, "Hot Bob" (Eldon), which was known as "The Bugger King" (and had "nothing to do with meat or sex"). 15 Minutes of Misery lasted for one series of six programmes in late 1998 and early 1999.

In 1999, 15 Minutes of Misery was expanded into the half-hour series 15 Storeys High co-written by Lock and Martin Trenaman. From ostensibly the same tower block, Lock's character was now given a flatmate (the hapless Errol) and a job at the local swimming baths, as well as a somewhat dour and intolerant demeanour. The bugging device was no longer used, but the antics of Lock's neighbours still featured heavily in the show. The plots for this series were more linear in a "traditional" sitcom style, although they still showed Lock's brand of dark, surreal humour. 15 Storeys High would transfer to television after two radio series, with Lock's character renamed 'Vince', for a further two series in 2002 and 2004. Initially aired on BBC Choice, it follows a cynical Vince and his naive flatmate Errol (Benedict Wong). It attracted a cult following after its release as a VHS box-set and on DVD.

Other work
In 1995, Lock played an escaped murderer in an episode of The World of Lee Evans, alongside Lee Evans and Phil Daniels. Lock wrote the screenplay for Andrew Kötting's 2001 feature film This Filthy Earth, based on the novel La Terre by Émile Zola. In 2004, Lock had a guest appearance in television's first ever "dope opera", Top Buzzer, written by Johnny Vaughan.

In 2005, he became a regular team captain on the Channel 4 panel game 8 Out of 10 Cats. In an article at the time of his death, The Guardian said Lock "will be best remembered as a team captain for the first 18 series of... 8 Out of 10 Cats...  and he quickly emerged as its biggest star." He was a team captain on 8 Out of 10 Cats between 2005 and 2015, and on its spin-off 8 Out of 10 Cats Does Countdown between 2012 and 2021.

In spring 2006, he hosted his own entertainment show on Channel 4 called TV Heaven, Telly Hell. Lock narrated the BBC production World Cup Goals Galore in 2006. In 2008, he appeared on The Big Fat Quiz of the Year, on a team with James Corden. Lock also appeared on many popular British TV panel shows including Have I Got News for You, QI and They Think It's All Over. He was also a celebrity guest in The Last Leg. Lock became "The Curator" for the second radio series of The Museum of Curiosity, in 2009, taking over from Bill Bailey.

In 2010, Lock took part in Channel 4's Comedy Gala, a benefit show held in aid of Great Ormond Street Children's Hospital, filmed live at The O2 Arena. He also appeared in a spoof video produced by Shelter, the housing charity, to highlight the problem of rogue landlords. In 2011, he took over from John Sergeant as the host of the Dave comedy panel show, Argumental. In 2019, Lock featured in episode 4 of the BBC comedy series Mandy.

Comedic style
Lock was known for his surreal style, deadpan delivery, and dry humour. The Guardian stated that he was "celebrated for his carefully crafted surreal content and imaginative observational wit". Lock stated that comedy is not always easy, saying: "The real secret ... is every day spending tedious hours straining over a blank sheet of paper trying to think of something funny. Some days I'd rather try and lay an egg."

Ed Power of The Daily Telegraph described his persona as "studiedly obtuse". He said Lock's topics included political correctness, "existential woe", and the difficulties of being a football supporter which gave him "irresistible everyman quality". Power described him as "a Samuel Beckett trapped inside a Tommy Cooper punchline." Power also suggested that his persona was so convincing because it matched what he was like off-stage. Fellow comedian Harry Hill said, "People are tempted to pigeonhole him as dark or surreal but he was more than that. He had a playful side; a wide-eyed wonder at the world".

During an interview with Bill Bailey on the Channel 4 show Comic's Choice, Lock listed Sam Kinison and Lenny Bruce as his main comedy influences. On the BBC Radio 2 show "Talking Comedy" he listed Paul Merton, Steven Wright, Jasper Carrott, Les Dawson, Jerry Sadowitz, Kenneth Williams and Hylda Baker as his favourite comedians.

Personal life
Lock and his wife, Anoushka Nara Giltsoff, had two daughters, born in 2004 and 2006, and a son born in 2009. The family lived in the Muswell Hill area of London.

Lock was diagnosed with skin cancer in 1990, attributing the condition to overexposure to the sun while working as a builder in the early 1980s. After seeing his doctor, he was referred to a dermatologist at Guy's Hospital, London, and made a full recovery. In May 2012, he gave his support to a Sun Awareness event at the hospital.

Lock was a supporter of Chelsea F.C. and was an active supporter of the Muswell Hill soup kitchen. In December 2020, Lock made a video to help raise funds for Edible London, a charity that aimed to provide ingredients for a million meals to help those struggling in lockdown. In the clip, he quipped, "I'm Sean Lock. You may know me as that bloke off the telly whose name you can't remember."

Death and tributes
Lock died of cancer at his home, on 16 August 2021, aged 58. According to Bill Bailey, a close friend of Lock, he had been diagnosed with advanced lung cancer a few years earlier. 

Those who paid tribute included fellow 8 Out of 10 Cats performers Jimmy Carr, Jon Richardson, Rachel Riley, and Susie Dent; and many comedians, Chelsea F.C.; QI; and Channel 4. Harry Hill wrote a piece in The Guardian, describing him as "the comedian's comedian". On 19 August 2021, Channel 4 aired a tribute to Lock, showing his stand-up show Keep It Light along with an episode of 8 Out of 10 Cats Does Countdown. Chelsea Football Club paid tribute to Lock on 11 September during their fixture against Aston Villa with a one-minute applause during the 58th (the age at which he died) minute of the match.

Fans of Lock called for his book The Tiger Who Came for a Pint, a parody book read on 8 Out of 10 Cats Does Countdown based on the children's book The Tiger Who Came to Tea, to be published, with some fans suggesting the proceeds should go to cancer research in his honour. In addition, the tribute night of programming prompted fans and friends, including Kathy Burke, to call for the BBC to add 15 Storeys High to its online service. Following this, the BBC released both series of the show onto its iPlayer service on 27 August 2021.

In August 2022, Bill Bailey completed a charity walk in memory of Lock, raising more than £110,000.

Filmography

Television

Radio

Stand-up DVDs

Awards and nominations
Lock was voted the 55th-greatest stand-up comic on Channel 4's 100 Greatest Stand-Ups in 2007 and as the 19th-greatest stand-up comic in the updated 2010 list.

Notes

References

External links

 
 Sean Lock at the British Film Institute
 
 Sean Lock writes the foreword for the novel Nappy Rash by Mark Kotting on Wrecking Ball Press 
  from Channel 4

1963 births
2021 deaths
20th-century English comedians
20th-century English male actors
20th-century English writers
21st-century English comedians
21st-century English male actors
21st-century English writers
Alumni of the Drama Centre London
British male television writers
British surrealist artists
Comedians from Surrey
Deaths from cancer in England
English male comedians
English male television actors
English radio personalities
English stand-up comedians
English television personalities
English television writers
English people of Irish descent
People from Chertsey
People from Woking